Erik Skou (11 February 1917 – 1 May 1984) was a Danish swimmer. He competed in the men's 200 metre breaststroke at the 1936 Summer Olympics.

References

External links
 

1917 births
1984 deaths
Olympic swimmers of Denmark
Swimmers at the 1936 Summer Olympics
People from Horsens
Danish male breaststroke swimmers
Sportspeople from the Central Denmark Region